Pagria liturata is a species of leaf beetle distributed in Angola, the Democratic Republic of the Congo (Garamba and Upemba National Parks), Ethiopia and South Sudan. It was described by Édouard Lefèvre in 1891. Its host plants include Vitex doniana and Sporobolus pyramidalis.

References

Eumolpinae
Beetles of the Democratic Republic of the Congo
Beetles described in 1891
Insects of Angola
Insects of Ethiopia
Insects of Sudan
Taxa named by Édouard Lefèvre